Castillo Ortega-Douglas, also known as Castillo Douglas, is a castle-like house in central Aguascalientes, Aguascalientes, Mexico. The house is notable for having the features of a medieval castle, including a moat, a drawbridge, battlements, turrets, and a stained glass window.

References

Buildings and structures in Aguascalientes
Castles in Mexico